Several ships of the French Navy have borne the name Magnanime:
 
 , an 80-gun ship of the line, launched in 1673, and sunk during the Battle of Cabrita Point on 21 March 1705.
 , a 72-gun ship, launched in 1706, and wrecked in 1712.
 , a 74-gun ship, launched in 1744, and captured by the British in 1748, and broken up in 1775.
 , a 74-gun ship, launched in 1779, and broken up in 1793.
 , 74-gun ship of the line launched in 1803, and laid up in 1816.

See also
 

French Navy ship names